Kate De Goldi (born 1959) is a New Zealand novelist, children's writer and short story writer. Her early work was published under the pseudonym Kate Flannery.

Early life
De Goldi was born in Christchurch in 1959. She is of mixed Irish and Italian ancestry.

Career
De Goldi published her first collection of short stories like you, really (1994) under the pseudonym Kate Flannery.

De Goldi has been a full-time writer since 1997, and contributes to the New Zealand literature sector as a creative writing teacher (1999-2006 at the IIML), a book-related broadcaster and radio commentator, a participant of Writers in Schools, and a chair for literary festivals in New Zealand and internationally. De Goldi is an Arts Foundation Laureate (named in 2001).

De Goldi received the 2010 Michael King Fellowship to research and write an article about Susan Price. De Goldi has received both the 2011 Margaret Mahy Award and the 2011 Young Readers' Award Corine Literature Prize, She is known for children's literature and has also won awards for her short story writing, including the Katherine Mansfield Memorial Award in 1999.

Selected works

Novels 
 1996 – Sanctuary, 
 1997 – Love, Charlie Mike, 
1999 – Closed, Stranger, 
 2008 – The 10pm Question, 
2012 – The ACB with Honora Lee, illustrated by Gregory O'Brien, 
2015 – From the Cutting Room of Barney Kettle, 
2022 – Eddy, Eddy,

Picture books 
 2005 - Clubs: A Lolly Leopold Story, illustrated by Jacqui Colley, 
2005 - Uncle Jack, illustrated by Jacqui Colley, 
2008 - A Lolly Leopold Story, illustrated by Jacqui Colley,

Editor with Susan Paris 
 2016 - Annual (Gecko Press) 
 2017 - Annual 2 (Annual Ink)

References 

New Zealand children's writers
New Zealand women children's writers
New Zealand women short story writers
New Zealand people of Irish descent
New Zealand people of Italian descent
1959 births
Living people
20th-century New Zealand women writers
21st-century New Zealand women writers
20th-century New Zealand writers
21st-century New Zealand writers
Writers from Christchurch